The 8th constituency of Seine-et-Marne is a French legislative constituency in the Seine-et-Marne département.

Description

The 8th constituency of Seine-et-Marne lies in its centre and includes parts of the vast new town of Marne-la-Vallée. The seat contains Disneyland Paris.

The seat is a classic marginal changing hands at every election since 1988 with the sole exception of 2007. In 2022, LREM retained the seat by only four votes from the EELV/NUPES candidate.

Historic Representation

Election results

2022

 
 
 
 
 
 
 
|-
| colspan="8" bgcolor="#E9E9E9"|
|-

2017

 
 
 
 
 
 
 
 
|-
| colspan="8" bgcolor="#E9E9E9"|
|-

2012

 
 
 
 
 
 
|-
| colspan="8" bgcolor="#E9E9E9"|
|-

Sources

Official results of French elections from 2002: "Résultats électoraux officiels en France" (in French).

8